Mid-air retrieval is a technique used in atmospheric reentry when the reentering vehicle is incapable of a satisfactory unassisted landing. The vehicle is slowed by means of parachutes, and then a specially-equipped aircraft matches the vehicle's trajectory and catches it in mid-air.

This is a risky technique, and so is only used when other forms of landing are infeasible. Successful mid-air retrieval requires correct operation of the retrieving aircraft, favourable atmospheric conditions, and successful execution of a tricky manoeuvre, in addition to correct operation of the vehicle itself. These risks can be mitigated somewhat: for example, multiple recovery aircraft can be used. The need for human aviators to perform a manoeuvre which would normally be classed as a stunt may in the future be avoided by advances in unmanned aerial vehicles.

Notable uses of the technique:
 The first use of midair retrieval was in 1955, with Fairchild C-119 Flying Boxcar transports being used to recover Ryan AQM-34 Firebee target drones during test flights. On operational flights, the Firebee used the Sikorsky SH-3 Sea King helicopter as its recovery aircraft.
The early-1960s era Corona reconnaissance satellite returned delicate film capsules to Earth that required mid-air retrieval by a specially modified aircraft. Early in the program, modified C-119 Flying Boxcar airlifters were used, replaced in 1961 by modified JC-130B Hercules and supplemented in 1966 with JC-130H. These aircraft were manned by a crew of 10 personnel. The crew consisted of two pilots, one flight engineer, two telemetry operators, one winch operator, and four riggers. The telemetry operators would acquire the location of the satellite and relay the info to the pilots. Once visually acquired the pilots would head on course to the satellite descending towards the Pacific Ocean. One could visually acquire the satellite and its parachute at an altitude of approximately 50,000 ft. The winch operator and the riggers would deploy the retrieving apparatus called the "Loop", which consisted of high quality nylon rope with a series of brass hooks spliced into the apparatus. The whole snatching operation by the pilots was done visually. The winch operator and the four riggers would deploy the loop. Once contact was made between the parachute and the loop the winch line would pay out and stop. The winch then was put into gear and the retrieval process commenced. Once on board, the aircraft flew back to Hickam Air Force Base, where they were stationed, where the satellite or canister was offloaded onto a truck and then loaded immediately onto a running C-141 airlifter and then transported to a location in Maryland for analysis. The crews acquired these skills by practicing almost daily on practice missions, carried out with other aircraft dropping dummy bombs with chutes attached. The weights were 200 lb. in the early 70s and later to the conical parachute system which weighed in at 1,100 lb.
 In a similar vein to Corona, the Soviet Zenit spy satellites were recovered in midair by modified Mil Mi-8 helicopters. 
 At the White Sands Missile Range, prototype ballistic missile warheads and rocket nose cones were retrieved after suborbital test flights. Sikorsky CH-37 Mojave helicopters were used to recover the nose cones in midair so the effects of re-entry could be studied. 
 The Genesis mission returned a sample of solar wind particles in a "particle trap" device that was so delicate, that it would have been damaged by a parachute landing. This task called for a plan involving a mid-air retrieval, using helicopters flown by Hollywood stunt pilots contracted by NASA. Its parachutes failed to deploy, leading to a disastrous high speed impact with the desert floor, which shattered the trap's delicate wafers holding the solar wind particle samples.
 An early design for SpaceShipOne called for a shuttlecock-like shape that would have made it incapable of landing independently, necessitating mid-air retrieval. This was deemed too risky, and the final design made the spacecraft capable of independent horizontal landing while retaining the desired aerodynamic qualities for the early part of reentry.
 During the Cold War, Lockheed HC-130 Hercules and Fairchild C-119 Flying Boxcar airlifters were used to recover film capsules ejected from unmanned high-altitude reconnaissance balloons under programs such as Project Genetrix and Project Moby Dick. The C-130 was also used to recover film capsules ejected from the experimental Lockheed D-21 high-speed reconnaissance drone. 
 The United Launch Alliance's proposed Vulcan rocket is intended to have the main engines on its first stage recovered in midair by helicopter so that it can be reused for further launches. 
 NASA operated a Shorts Skyvan airplane nicknamed the “Ugly Hooker”, which was used for several years to recover instrument packages ejected from sounding rockets and unmanned research balloons.
 The Dynetics X-61 reconnaissance drone is intended to be launched from a carrier aircraft and recovered in midair after their mission by a modified C-130 Hercules, using a device similar to that previously used to recover film capsules from spy satellites.  On the X-61's first flight, on January 17, 2020, the drone's main parachute failed to open, and the midair recovery failed, resulting in the loss of the drone. Subsequent test flights have resulted in successful retrievals. 
US-New Zealand aerospace company Rocket Lab has announced plans to recover their Electron rocket for reuse by helicopter. The first successful midair recovery of an Electron booster was made on 3 May, 2022.

Image gallery

See also
Fulton surface-to-air recovery system, sometimes nicknamed "Skyhook"
Airborne aircraft carrier

References 

Aircraft operations
Spacecraft